Kollariana is a genus of moths of the family Noctuidae.

References
Natural History Museum Lepidoptera genus database

Noctuidae